Central Macdonald is a hamlet village of Sydney, in the state of New South Wales, Australia. It is located in the City of Hawkesbury just south of St Albans. Macdonald Valley Public School is situated in the village. It was previously known as the village of Benton.

Population (incl. Higher Macdonald, Upper Macdonald and Lower Macdonald) is 174 (Census 2001).

Suburbs of Sydney
City of Hawkesbury